Dāvids Veiss (22 September 1879 – 15 June 1961) was a Latvian sports shooter. He competed in four events at the 1912 Summer Olympics, representing the Russian Empire.

References

1879 births
1961 deaths
Latvian male sport shooters
Male sport shooters from the Russian Empire
Olympic competitors for the Russian Empire
Shooters at the 1912 Summer Olympics
People from Jelgava Municipality
Latvian emigrants to the United States